Leonard "Leo" Setiawan is mainly known as a former guitarist for progressive metal band Kekal. His main occupation is civil engineer and he owns and operates a building development firm in Jakarta, Indonesia.

Kekal

Leo joined Kekal in 1996, just after the band released their official demo, Contra Spiritualia Nequitiae. Kekal had originally been primarily a black metal band but Leo brought with him a diverse set of musical influences which, throughout the first 5 years, allowed the band to develop their style by incorporating many diverse elements from outside metal. This distinct style became most prominent in their third album The Painful Experience, which marked as a starting point for the band to step more and more into progressive and avant-garde metal and make further experiments with their music. Shortly after this album was released, Leo Setiawan left the band and moved to Melbourne, where he pursued his master's degree in Civil Engineering.

Leo Setiawan later moved back to Indonesia, and was back in the studio with Kekal to record their official reunion album, Acidity in 2005.

In 2009, Kekal front man Jeff Arwadi stepped down from the band and Leo announced that, since Jeff left the band, he would as well. As bassist Azhar Sianturi had already left Kekal, the departure of Jeff and Leo rendered the band member-less. Despite this, it was decided that Kekal would continue as an institution. In evidence of the band's continued existence, Kekal has released two more albums to date; 8 and Autonomy in 2010 and 2012 respectively, to which all 3 former members of Kekal have contributed.

Discography
 Beyond the Glimpse of Dreams – 1998
 Embrace the Dead – 1999
 The Painful Experience – 2001
 Self Krusher compilation: 5th Anniversary THT Productions – 2001
 Introduce Us to Immortality – 2003
 Road Trip to Acidity – 2005
 Acidity – 2005
 The Habit of Fire – 2007
 Audible Minority – 2008
 8 – 2010
 Autonomy – 2012

References

Year of birth missing (living people)
Living people
Musicians from Jakarta
Indonesian heavy metal musicians
Indonesian guitarists
Kekal members
Christian anarchists